Nataliia Krol, born Nataliya Oleksandrivna Pryshchepa (born 11 September 1994) is a Ukrainian athlete who specialises in middle-distance running.

Career
Pryshchepa won the 1500 metres event at the 2013 European Junior Championships and the bronze medal in the 1500 m at the 2015 European U23 Championships. She won the gold medal in the 800 metres event at the 2016 and 2018 European Championships. 

In November 2019, Pryshchepa married kickboxer Roman Krol, changing her name to Nataliya Krol.

In February 2020, she received a provisional suspension after a positive test for doping. In August, she received a 20-months suspension taking effect on 16 January 2020, without being stripped from her two European titles.

Personal bests

Outdoor

References

External links 
 
 
 

1994 births
Living people
Ukrainian female middle-distance runners
European Athletics Championships medalists
Athletes (track and field) at the 2016 Summer Olympics
Olympic athletes of Ukraine
Sportspeople from Rivne
Athletes (track and field) at the 2019 European Games
European Games medalists in athletics
European Games gold medalists for Ukraine
Doping cases in athletics
Ukrainian sportspeople in doping cases
20th-century Ukrainian women
21st-century Ukrainian women